Auguste Pittaud de Forges (5 April 1803 (15 germinal an XI)  – 28 September 1881,) was a 19th-century French playwright.

Biography 
His full name was Philippe-Auguste-Alfred Pittaud. He began his literary career under the pseudonyms Deforges, de Forge or Desforges. In 1861, he was authorized by imperial decree to officially join to his family name that of de Forges, He also used the pen name Paul de Lussan 

He wrote many vaudevilles in collaboration with Adolphe de Leuven, Emmanuel Théaulon, Jean-François Bayard, Louis-Émile Vanderburch, Clairville, Adrien Robert, as well as librettos of several opéras comiques and operettas for Jacques Offenbach such as L'alcôve, opéra comique in 1 act (1847), Luc et Lucette, opéra comique in 1 act (1854), Paimpol et Périnette, saynète in 1 act (1855), Le 66, operetta in 1 act (1856), Les vivandières de la grande-armée, operetta bouffa in 1 act (1859), Fleurette, oder Trompeter und Näherin (composed as Fleurette c. 1863), opéra comique in 1 act (1872), Adolphe Adam (Le Bijou perdu, 1853 ; Les Pantins de Violette, 1856), Friedrich von Flotow (La veuve Grapin (revised in 1861 as  Madame Bonjour)), etc.

Knighted on 5 June 1850, he was named an officer of the Legion of Honour on 12 August 1862. He was also a commander of the Order of St. Gregory the Great (Vatican), commander of the Order of Isabella the Catholic (Spain), officer in the Order of Léopold (Belgium) and knight of the Order of Saints Maurice and Lazarus (Italy)

Iconography

Bibliography 
 Louis Gustave Vapereau, « Deforges (Philippe-Auguste Pittaud) », Dictionnaire universel des littératures, Paris, Hachette, 1876, (p. 497-98), at Gallica

References 

19th-century French dramatists and playwrights
French librettists
Commanders of the Order of Isabella the Catholic
Officers of the Order of Saints Maurice and Lazarus
Officiers of the Légion d'honneur
Writers from Paris
1803 births
1881 deaths